Charles Daniel Richmond (December 15, 1931 – March 16, 1988) was an American jazz drummer who is best known for his work with Charles Mingus. He also worked with Joe Cocker, Elton John and Mark-Almond.

Biography
Richmond was born Charles Daniel Richmond on December 15, 1931, in New York City and grew up in Greensboro, North Carolina. He started playing tenor saxophone at the age of thirteen, and went on to play R&B with the Paul Williams band in 1955.

His career took off when he took up the drums, which he had taught himself to play in his early twenties, through the formation of what was to be a 21-year association with Charles Mingus. Mingus biographer Brian Priestley writes that "Dannie became Mingus's equivalent to Harry Carney in the Ellington band, an indispensable ingredient of 'the Mingus sound' and a close friend as well".

That association continued after Mingus' death when Richmond became the first musical director of the group Mingus Dynasty in 1980.

He died of a heart attack in Harlem on March 16, 1988, at the age of 56.

Discography

As leader
 1965: "In" Jazz for the Culture Set (Impulse!)
 1979: Ode to Mingus (Soul Note)
 1980: Hand to Hand (Soul Note)  with George Adams
 1980: Dannie Richmond Plays Charles Mingus (Timeless)
 1980: The Last Mingus Band A.D. (Landmark) originally released as Dannie Richmond Quintet (Gatemouth)
 1981: Three or Four Shades of Dannie Richmond Quintet (Tutu) released 1991
 1983: Gentleman's Agreement (Soul Note) with George Adams
 1983: Dionysius (Red)

As sideman

With Charles Mingus
 The Clown (Atlantic, 1957)
 Mingus Three (Jubilee, 1957)
 Tijuana Moods (RCA Victor, 1957)
 East Coasting (Bethlehem, 1957)
 Jazz Portraits: Mingus in Wonderland (United Artists, 1959)
 Blues & Roots (Atlantic, 1959 [1960])
 Mingus Ah Um (Columbia, 1959)
 Mingus Dynasty (Columbia, 1959)
 Pre-Bird (Mercury, 1960)
 Mingus at Antibes (Atlantic, 1960 [1976])
 Charles Mingus Presents Charles Mingus (Candid, 1960)
 Mingus (Candid, 1960 [1961])
 Reincarnation of a Lovebird (Candid, 1960 [1988])
 Oh Yeah (Atlantic, 1961 [1962])
 Tonight at Noon (Atlantic, 1957/61 [1964])
 The Complete Town Hall Concert (Blue Note, 1962 [1994])
 The Black Saint and the Sinner Lady (Impulse!, 1963)
 Mingus Mingus Mingus Mingus Mingus (Impulse!, 1963)
 The Cornell Concert (Blue Note, 1964 [2007])
 Town Hall Concert (Jazz Workshop, 1964)
 Revenge! (Revenge, 1964 [1996])
 The Great Concert of Charles Mingus (America, 1964 [1971])
 Mingus in Europe Volume I (Enja, 1964 [1980])
 Mingus in Europe Volume II (Enja, 1964 [1983])
 Right Now: Live at the Jazz Workshop (Fantasy, 1964 [1966])
 Mingus at Monterey (Jazz Workshop, 1964)
 My Favorite Quintet (Jazz Workshop, 1965 [1966])
 Music Written for Monterey 1965 (Jazz Workshop, 1965)
 Charles Mingus in Paris: The Complete America Session (Sunnyside, 1970 [2006]) originally released as Blue Bird and Pithycanthropus Erectus
 Charles Mingus Sextet In Berlin (Beppo, 1970)
 Let My Children Hear Music (Columbia, 1971)
 Mingus Moves (Atlantic, 1973)
 Changes One (Atlantic, 1973)
 Changes Two (Atlantic, 1973)
 Mingus at Carnegie Hall (Atlantic, 1974)
 Cumbia & Jazz Fusion (Atlantic, 1976)
 Me, Myself an Eye (Atlantic, 1978)
 Something Like a Bird (Atlantic, 1978)

With George Adams and Don Pullen
Jazz a Confronto 21 (Horo, 1975)
 All That Funk (Palcoscenico, 1979)
 More Funk (Palcoscenico, 1979)
 Don't Lose Control (Soul Note, 1979)
 Earth Beams (Timeless, 1981)
 Life Line (Timeless, 1981)
 City Gates (Timeless, 1983)
 Live at the Village Vanguard (Soul Note, 1983)
 Live at the Village Vanguard Vol. 2 (Soul Note, 1983)
 Decisions (Timeless, 1984)
Live at Montmartre (Timeless, 1985)
 Breakthrough (Blue Note, 1986)
 Song Everlasting (Blue Note, 1987)
With Pepper Adams
Pepper Adams Plays the Compositions of Charlie Mingus (Workshop Jazz, 1964)

With others 
With Ray Anderson
Old Bottles - New Wine (Enja, 1985)
With Chet Baker
(Chet Baker Sings) It Could Happen to You (1958)
With Ted Curson
Plenty of Horn (Old Town, 1961)
With Booker Ervin
The Book Cooks (Bethlehem, 1960)
Cookin' (Savoy, 1960)
With Ricky FordLoxodonta Africana (New World, 1977)Manhattan Plaza (Muse, 1978)
With Bert JanschMoonshine (1973)
With John JenkinsJenkins, Jordan and Timmons (Prestige, 1957) – with Clifford Jordan and Bobby TimmonsJohn Jenkins with Kenny Burrell (Blue Note, 1957) – with Kenny Burrell
With Duke JordanTivoli One (SteepleChase, 1978, [1984])Tivoli Two (SteepleChase, 1978, [1984])Wait and See (SteepleChase, 1978 [1994])
With Jimmy KnepperA Swinging Introduction to Jimmy Knepper (Bethlehem 1957)Cunningbird (SteepleChase, 1976)
With Horace ParlanBlue Parlan (Steeplechase, 1978)Like Someone in Love (Steeplechase, 1983)
With Herbie NicholsLove, Gloom, Cash, Love (1957)
With Sahib ShihabThe Jazz We Heard Last Summer (Savoy, 1957)
With Zoot Sims
 Down Home (Bethlehem, 1960)
With Mal WaldronWhat It Is (Enja, 1981)
With Bennie Wallace
 Mystic Bridge'' (Enja, 1982)

References

External links
[ Allmusic biography]

1935 births
1988 deaths
Musicians from New York City
Post-bop jazz musicians
American jazz drummers
American session musicians
Impulse! Records artists
Timeless Records artists
Landmark Records artists
20th-century American drummers
American male drummers
Jazz musicians from New York (state)
20th-century American male musicians
American male jazz musicians
Mingus Dynasty (band) members